Pythias, also known as Pythias the Elder, was a Greek biologist and embryologist. She was the adoptive daughter of Hermias of Atarneus, as well as Aristotle's first wife.

Personal life and family
Whilst Pythias' date of birth is unclear, she was active around 355 BC and she died in Athens sometime after 330 BC.  Aristotle and Pythias had a daughter, Pythias the Younger.

Pythias the Younger
Pythias the Younger married three times, but is also said to have predeceased her father.  Her first husband was Nicanor, Aristotle's nephew by his sister Arimneste. According to Aristotle's will, Nicanor was to manage the family affairs until his son, Nicomachus came of age.  Pythias' second husband was Procles of Sparta.  Pythias' third husband was Metrodorus, a physician.

Work in biology
Pythias supposedly worked with her husband, Aristotle, on an encyclopedia from the material they gathered on their honeymoon on Mytilene. She is reputed to have collected a range of specimens of living things. Kate Campbell Hurd-Mead suggests that the couple collaborated in the study of generation.

References

4th-century BC Greek women
Aristotle
4th-century BC Greek people
4th-century BC deaths
Metics in Classical Athens
Women biologists
Ancient Greek biologists
Embryologists
Year of birth unknown
Ancient women scientists